Hannes Astok (born 25 September 1964 in Tallinn) is an Estonian journalist, radio presenter and politician. He has been member of XI Riigikogu.

Astok was the Deputy Mayor of Tartu from 1997 until 2005. He is a member of Estonian Reform Party.

References

1964 births
Living people
Estonian journalists
Estonian radio personalities
Estonian Reform Party politicians
Members of the Riigikogu, 2007–2011
Recipients of the Order of the White Star, 4th Class
University of Tartu alumni
People from Tallinn
Politicians from Tallinn